Boubaker Zitouni (born 16 November 1965) is a Tunisian former footballer who played as a goalkeeper. He made 23 appearances for the Tunisia national team from 1989 to 1997. He was also named in Tunisia's squad for the 1996 African Cup of Nations tournament.

References

1965 births
Living people
Tunisian footballers
Association football goalkeepers
Tunisia international footballers
1996 African Cup of Nations players
CO Transports players
Club Africain players